Hans Dekkers (born 8 August 1981, in Eindhoven) is a Dutch racing cyclist.

Major results

2001
 1st Stage 6 Ruban Granitier Breton
 1st Stage 1 Mainfranken-Tour
2002
 1st Grand Prix de Waregem
 Mainfranken-Tour
1st Stages 2 & 4
 1st Stage 1 Le Triptyque des Monts et Châteaux
 1st Stage 1 Ruban Granitier Breton
 1st Stage 7 Olympia's Tour
 3rd Road race, National Under-23 Road Championships
 3rd ZLM Tour
2003
 Olympia's Tour
1st Points classification
1st Stages 2, 4 & 5
 Tour de Normandie
1st Stages 1 & 4
 1st Stage 1 Le Triptyque des Monts et Châteaux
 2nd Road race, National Under-23 Road Championships
 2nd Beverbeek Classic
2004
 2nd Nationale Sluitingsprijs
2005
 1st Memorial Van Coningsloo
 Tour du Loir-et-Cher
1st Stages 2 & 4
 Olympia's Tour
1st Stages 1 & 4
 1st Stage 3 GP CTT Correios de Portugal
 2nd Beverbeek Classic
 3rd Overall Tour du Loir-et-Cher
 4th Overall Tour de Normandie
1st Stages 2, 6 & 7
 4th Ronde van Noord-Holland
 9th Omloop der Kempen
2006
 1st Stage 3 Tour de l'Avenir
 2nd Scratch, National Track Championships
 3rd Grand Prix de Denain
 3rd Grand Prix de Rennes
2007
 1st Stage 2 Driedaagse van West-Vlaanderen
2008
 1st Nationale Sluitingsprijs
 2nd Omloop van de Vlaamse Scheldeboorden
 6th Omloop van het Houtland
 8th Rund um die Nürnberger Altstadt
2009
 1st Stage 1 (TTT) Tour of Qatar
 2nd Overall International Cycling Classic
1st Stage 4
2010
 8th Beverbeek Classic
2011
 7th Omloop van het Waasland

References

1981 births
Living people
Dutch male cyclists
Sportspeople from Eindhoven
Cyclists from North Brabant
20th-century Dutch people
21st-century Dutch people